Turbonilla grandis is a species of sea snail, a marine gastropod mollusk in the family Pyramidellidae, the pyrams and their allies.

Description
The shell grows to a length of 18 mm.

Distribution
This species occurs in the following locations:
 Northwest Atlantic, off Virginia, USA at a depth of 2893m.

Notes
Additional information regarding this species:
 Distribution: Range: 37.42°N ; 73.2°W. Distribution: USA: Virginia

References

External links
 To Biodiversity Heritage Library (7 publications)
 To Encyclopedia of Life
 To USNM Invertebrate Zoology Mollusca Collection
 To ITIS
 To World Register of Marine Species

grandis
Gastropods described in 1885